Asbjørn Antoni Holm (9 April 1921 – 4 February 2001) was a Norwegian politician for the Socialist People's Party.

He was born in Langenes.

He was elected to the Norwegian Parliament from Nordland in 1961, and was re-elected on one occasion. His party only held two seats during both these terms.

References

1921 births
2001 deaths
Members of the Storting
Nordland politicians
Socialist Left Party (Norway) politicians
20th-century Norwegian politicians